Lilit Hovhannisyan (born 7 December 1987), is an Armenian pop singer.

Career

2006: Hay Superstar 
Lilit was a finalist of the first season of Hay Superstar, the Armenian version of Pop Idol. She was eliminated on 3 July 2006, placing fourth out of the ten participants.

2011 to present 
Lilit has had several successful singles since 2011. As of September 2021, her music video for Im tiknikn es has over 117 million views, making it the 2nd most viewed song on YouTube by an Armenian artist (not including songs by American band System of a Down) after Super Sako's Mi Gna, and her music videos for Gnchu and Es Em Horinel and De El Mi have achieved over 5 million views on YouTube, and the videos for Im Srtin Asa, Te Axchiq Lineir, Eli Lilit and Armenian Girl have achieved over 3 million views. On 29 September 2013, Lilit performed a solo concert entitled 'Top Stars of Armenia' alongside Mihran Tsarukyan in Los Angeles, California at the Pasadena Civic Auditorium.

Personal life 
Hovhannisyan is married to Armenian songwriter and record producer Vahram Petrosyan since June 29, 2011.

Discography

Studio albums 
Nran (2011)

Singles 

 "Voch-Voch" (2011)
 "Nran" (2011)
 "Mayrik" (2011)
 "Im Srtin Asa" (2012)
 "Too-Too-Too" (2012) (produced by DerHova)
 "Te Aghjik Lineir" (2012)
 "Es Em Horinel" (2012)
 "Requiem" (2013)
 "Qez Mi Or Togheci" (2013)
 "Gnchu" (2013)
 "Eli Lilit" (2013)
 "Elegia" (2013)
 "Qez Khabel Em" (2014)
 "Armenian Girl" (2014) (produced by DerHova)
 "Indz Chspanes" (2014)
 "De El Mi" (2014)
 "Im tiknikn es" (2015)
 "Mexican" (2015) (Armenian, Spanish)
 "Im Ser,Atum Em Qez" (2015)
 "Im bajin sere" (2016)
 "HETDIMO" (2016)
 "Hin Chanaparhov" (2016)
 "Avirel Es" (2017)
 "Balkan Song" (2018)
 "Bulgarian" (2018)
 "Tshnamus chem cankana" (2018)
Ti ti ti (2021)

Awards and achievements 
Here is chronologically the awards Lilit Hovhannisyan has received so far.

References

External links 
 Official website

Armenian pop singers
1987 births
Musicians from Yerevan
Living people
21st-century Armenian women singers